PS Rouen was a passenger ferry that was built in Glasgow in 1888 for the London, Brighton and South Coast Railway (LB&SCR). In 1903 she was acquired by JP and RP Little for the Barrow Steam Navigation Company and renamed Duchess of Buccleuch. In 1907 she passed to the Midland Railway, and in 1909 she was scrapped.

Building
The Fairfield Shipbuilding and Engineering Company built Rouen in Govan, Glasgow as yard number 330. She was launched on 12 April 1888 by Mrs Allen Sarle, the wife of the secretary and general manager of the company.

She had accommodation for 110 first class and 108 second class passengers.

Rouen was a sidewheel paddle steamer.

Career
The LB&SCR registered Rouen in Newhaven. Her UK official number was 95353 and her code letters were LBHR. Her route was between Newhaven and Dieppe.

In 1903 James and Robert Little acquired her for the Barrow Steam Navigation Company, renamed her Duchess of Buccleuch, and registered her in Barrow. Her route was between Barrow and Douglas, Isle of Man. In 1907 the Midland Railway took over the Barrow SN Co. In 1909 the Midland withdrew Duchess of Buccleuch from service and she was scrapped.

References

1888 ships
Paddle steamers of the United Kingdom
Passenger ships of the United Kingdom
Ships built on the River Clyde
Ships of the Barrow Steam Navigation Company
Ships of the London, Brighton and South Coast Railway